Harry Goaz (born December 27, 1960, as Harry Preston King) is an American actor best known for his roles as Deputy Andy Brennan in the TV drama series, Twin Peaks (1990–1991, 2017), and as Sgt. Knight in the NBC TV series, Eerie Indiana (1991–1992).

Early life and education 
He was born in Jacksonville, North Carolina, and grew up in Beaumont, Texas. He attended the University of Texas at Austin, where he graduated with a degree in fine arts. He also studied acting under William Traylor at The Loft Studio in Los Angeles, California.

Career 
Goaz first met David Lynch while driving him to a memorial tribute to Roy Orbison where Lynch decided to cast him for the role of Deputy Andy Brennan in the TV series Twin Peaks. He followed up Twin Peaks with Eerie Indiana, a paranormal TV show created by Joe Dante. Goaz has also taken roles in independent films, such as Steven Soderbergh's The Underneath.

His piece of micro-fiction, "Donald's Holy Head", was published in Blacktop Passages in 2013.

Filmography

Film

Television

References

External links
 

1960 births
Living people
Male actors from Texas
University of Texas at Austin College of Fine Arts alumni